Betbaria Union is a union parishad situated at Khoksa Upazila,  in Kushtia District, Khulna Division of Bangladesh. There are 16 villages and 12 mouzas in the union.

References

External links
 

Unions of Khulna Division
Unions of Khoksa Upazila
Unions of Kushtia District